Guangkai Subdistrict is a subdistrict on the northern part of Nankai District, Tianjin, China. It borders Lingdangge Subdistrict to its north, Gulou and Xingnan Subdistircts to its east, Wanxing Subdistrict to its south, and Changhong Subdistrict to its west. In the year 2010, the subdistrict was home to 73,299 residents.

History

Administrative divisions 
As of 2021, Guangkai Subdistrict was made up of 13 residential communities. They are listed in the table below:

Gallery

References 

Township-level divisions of Tianjin
Nankai District, Tianjin